Mark Day (born 22 February 1961) is a British film editor. He won two BAFTA Awards for Best Editing for State of Play and Sex Traffic, both directed by David Yates with whom Day also worked with on The Way We Live Now, The Young Visiters and The Girl in the Café; the former two projects gained Day two Royal Television Society award nominations for Best Tape and Film Editing along with two BAFTA nominations and the latter project gained Day a Primetime Emmy Award nomination for Outstanding Single-Camera Picture Editing. Day also worked with Yates on The Sins and the final four Harry Potter films: Order of the Phoenix, Half-Blood Prince, Deathly Hallows – Part 1 and Deathly Hallows – Part 2. Day has edited over thirty television films and dramas.

Filmography

Feature films
 The Theory of Flight (1998)
 Mystics (2003)
 Harry Potter and the Order of the Phoenix (2007)
 Harry Potter and the Half-Blood Prince (2009)
 Harry Potter and the Deathly Hallows – Part 1 (2010)
 Harry Potter and the Deathly Hallows – Part 2 (2011)
 The Company You Keep (2012)
 About Time (2013)
 Ex Machina (2014)
 The Legend of Tarzan (2016)
 Fantastic Beasts and Where to Find Them (2016)
 Fantastic Beasts: The Crimes of Grindelwald (2018)
 Fantastic Beasts: The Secrets of Dumbledore (2022)

Television films
 Whatever Love Means
 The Girl in the Café 	
 Sex Traffic
 The Young Visiters
 State of Play
 Rose and Maloney
 Flesh and Blood
 The Way We Live Now
 NCS Manhunt
 Shockers
 The Sins
 Anna Karenina
 The Murder Rooms
 Donovan Quick
 Split Second
 The Fix
 The Wingless Bird
 The Tale of Sweeny Todd  	  	
 Cold Comfort Farm
 A Royal Scandal
 The Tide of Life
 Criminal
 Royal Celebration
 Suddenly Last Summer
 The Hummingbird Tree
 Memento Mori
 A Question of Attribution
 Tell Me That You Love Me
 The Police
 Number 27

References

External links 
 

British film editors
Living people
Place of birth missing (living people)
1958 births